Kyzyl-Chulpan (Qıźıl Sulpan) is a rural locality (a village) in Nureyevsky Selsoviet, Sharansky District, Bashkortostan, Russia. The population was 26 as of 2010. There is 1 street.

Geography 
Kyzyl-Chulpan is located 24 km southeast of Sharan (the district's administrative centre) by road. Nureyevo is the nearest rural locality.

References 

Rural localities in Sharansky District